Jeanne Leschi (active 1948–1959) was a French physical anthropologist known for her work with Wolof people and Dogon people in West Africa. Leschi completed her doctorate in science from the University of Paris. She was first employed by the French National Museum of Natural History and was a researcher at the Centre National de la Recherche Scientifique. She was a member of the Society of Anthropology of Paris.

Her work included an investigation on the melanoderm and leucoderm among races, which addressed idea that each human race has a distinct endocrine equilibrium. Her study approached the subject from the angle of the corti-adrenal function of melanoderm and leucoderm races.

References 

French women anthropologists
Physical anthropologists
French women scientists
French anthropologists
20th-century French women
Possibly living people
Year of birth missing